Camponotus nearcticus, commonly named smaller carpenter ant is a relatively small carpenter ant. Its appearance is similar of that to Lasius niger, commonly named the black garden ant. The ant is a household pest.

Identification
This species can be distinguished from other subgenus by little amounts of erect hairs on the gena, limited erect hairs on the clypeal disc and finally by the color which is a concolorous dark brown-black.

Distribution and habitat
Camponotus nearcticus colonies can be found in the United States and in Canada. They can be found in Ontario, and extend south from North Dakota to Colorado and Florida.

Prairies and woodlands are preferred habitats for Camponotus nearcticus ants. This ranges from deciduous forests, oaks and other pine forests. Colonies can be found in dead twigs, branches, logs, bark from trees in various conditions, pine cones and in wooden regions in buildings, usually around rooftops. Nests are small, consisting of only a few hundred individuals. However, a large nest which was studied on consisted of 531 individuals, not including the nests brood, and also reproductives were usually seen in nests from March to October. The ant is considered a household pest.

References

External links
Camponotus nearcticus entry at AntWeb

nearcticus
Hymenoptera of North America
Insects of Canada
Insects of the United States
Insects described in 1893
Household pest insects